is a railway station on the Hakata-Minami Line in Kasuga, Fukuoka, Japan. The station is operated by West Japan Railway Company (JR West).

Lines
The station is served by the Hakata-Minami Line from Hakata Station, and forms the only station on this  line. Hakata-Minami Line services are classed as "Limited express", although many are actually extensions of Sanyō Shinkansen Hikari or Kodama services.

Layout
The station consists of one elevated side platform, located adjacent to Hakata Shinkansen Depot.

History
The station opened on 1 April 1990.

See also
 List of railway stations in Japan

References

External links

 JR West station information 

Railway stations in Fukuoka Prefecture
Sanyō Shinkansen
Railway stations in Japan opened in 1990